The  Philadelphia Eagles season was the franchise's 80th season in the National Football League, and the fourteenth and final under head coach Andy Reid, as well as the tenth playing their home games at Lincoln Financial Field. Despite starting the season 3–1, the team would massively struggle, the team failed to improve on their 8–8 record from 2011, and went 1–11 in their final 12 games en route to a 4–12 record, their worst record since 1998 when they won only three games and also finished with losing record for the first time since 2005. Additionally, their four wins were not only by less than three points each, but all four of them had their deciding scores being acquired after the two-minute warnings. On December 31, 2012, Reid was fired after 14 seasons as the Eagles' head coach. Also, for the fourth consecutive season, the team the Eagles played in their home opener went on to win the Super Bowl.

The Eagles traded the fifteenth selection in the 2012 NFL Draft to the Seattle Seahawks along with a fourth and a sixth-round pick in exchange for the twelfth pick, where they selected defensive tackle Fletcher Cox.

Personnel changes
On January 8, cornerbacks coach Johnnie Lynn was fired. On January 11, Ryan Grigson, the Eagles' director of player personnel for the past two seasons, was hired as the new general manager of the Indianapolis Colts. On January 30, Todd Bowles, who served as the Miami Dolphins' interim head coach for the final three games of the  season, was hired as the Eagles' new defensive backs coach.

Despite speculation to the contrary, defensive coordinator Juan Castillo retained his job. Castillo was blamed by some fans for a series of fourth-quarter collapses early in the season, but the defense appeared to improve toward the end of the season.

Offensive coordinator Marty Mornhinweg was reportedly a candidate for several head coaching vacancies in this league, but those opportunities passed without him.

On October 16, 2012, Castillo was fired and replaced by Todd Bowles.

On December 3, 2012, defensive line coach Jim Washburn was fired. He was then replaced by Tommy Brasher.

Roster changes

Free agents

Trades
 On March 14, the Eagles traded tackle Winston Justice and a 2012 sixth-round draft selection to the Indianapolis Colts in exchange for the Colts' sixth-round selection.
 On March 20, the Eagles traded its 2012 third- and fourth-round draft selections to the Houston Texans in exchange for linebacker DeMeco Ryans and the Texans' third-round selection.
 On April 25, the Eagles traded cornerback Asante Samuel to the Atlanta Falcons for Atlanta's 2012 seventh round draft choice (229 overall, used to select Bryce Brown).
 On July 22, the Eagles traded cornerback D.J. Johnson to the Indianapolis Colts for former Penn State star defensive tackle Ollie Ogbu.
 On August 2, the Eagles once again traded with the Indianapolis Colts. This time, they traded linebacker Moise Fokou and linebacker Greg Lloyd, Jr. to the Colts for cornerback Kevin Thomas and a conditional seventh round pick in the 2013 NFL Draft.

2012 draft class

Draft notes

Staff

Final roster

Schedule
The Eagles began their season on a well-fitted 3–1 start by pulling off three close wins over the Browns, Ravens and Giants in September. However, from October and forward on, the Eagles hit a collapse as they lost 8 in a row and 11 of their final 12 games. During the 8-game losing streak, they allowed the Cowboys, Redskins, Steelers, Panthers and Saints to turn their seasons around with a win. The Eagles were eliminated from playoff contention with a loss to the Cowboys in Week 13. They also finished 2–6 at home, their worst-ever home record since 1972, losing their last six home games to finish the season (though they would lose the first four home games in 2013 to extend the streak to 10 games). The Eagles fired Andy Reid on December 31, 2012, the day after a 42–7 loss to the Giants after 14 years with the team. The 4–12 record was the Eagles' worst since the collapse of the Ray Rhodes era, and the 12 losses were the most of any season in Andy Reid's career.

Preseason

Regular season

Note: Intra-division opponents are in bold text.

Game summaries

Week 1: at Cleveland Browns

The Philadelphia Eagles opened up the season by traveling to Cleveland to square off against the Browns.  A 43-yard field goal by veteran Browns kicker Phil Dawson gave Cleveland a 3–0 lead some six minutes into the first quarter.  The Eagles would respond with a field goal of their own, though, as Alex Henery sent the ball through the uprights from 42 yards out just seconds into the second period.  With the score tied at 3–3 and just seventeen seconds before the half, an 18-yard pass from Eagles' quarterback Michael Vick to wideout Jeremy Maclin extended the Eagles lead by seven.  At the half, the score was 10–3, the Eagles leading the Browns by a seven-point margin.  Browns kicker Phil Dawson successfully converted another field goal from 42 yards away with just under five minutes left in the third quarter, trimming the score to 10–6.  Shortly afterwards, Dawson made the score 10–9 with a 22-yard field goal, his third of the day, and narrowing the Eagles' lead to one point with about fourteen minutes left in the game.  The underdog Browns continued the scoring streak, taking the lead on an errant Michael Vick throw and 27-yard interception return touchdown by D'Qwell Jackson approximately thirty seconds later.  With the score at 16–10 and an upset in the works, Michael Vick calmly drove the Eagles down the field and threw a strike to Clay Harbor from 4 yards out to return the lead to Philadelphia, 17–16.  The Browns were unable to reciprocate and the Philadelphia Eagles narrowly claimed the week one victory.  With the nail-biting win, the Eagles began their season 1–0.

Week 2: vs. Baltimore Ravens

The Eagles returned home to square off against the favored Baltimore Ravens in a Battle of the Birds.  Eagles' running back LeSean McCoy opened the scoring with a 1-yard touchdown run some ten minutes into the first quarter for a 7–0 lead.  However, the Ravens were able to tie the game up at 7–7 with Vonta Leach running for a 5-yard touchdown.  They would take the lead in the 2nd quarter as Joe Flacco found Jacoby Jones on a 21-yard touchdown pass to take a 14–7 lead followed by a 56-yard field goal by Justin Tucker for a 17–7 lead just before halftime.  The 3rd quarter was all Eagles as they managed to catch up with Michael Vick's 23-yard touchdown pass to Jeremy Maclin to make the score 17–14 and then tied the game with Alex Henery's 23-yard field goal at 17–17.  However, the Ravens moved back into the lead in the 4th quarter as Tucker was able to score 2 long field goals from 51 and 48 yards out to make the score 20–17 and 23–17 respectively.  The Eagles came out and surprisingly won the game with Vick's 1-yard QB rushing touchdown as the Eagles managed to win the game 24–23.

With the win, the Eagles improved to 2–0 and became the first team in NFL history to start a season 2–0 after winning their first 2 games by only a point.

Week 3: at Arizona Cardinals

After a 2–0 start, the Eagles traveled to take on the Cardinals.  The Cards struck first in the first quarter with Jay Feely's 47-yard field goal for a 3–0 lead followed by Kevin Kolb finding Michael Floyd on an 8-yard touchdown pass for a 10–0 lead.  The Cards would increase their lead in the 2nd quarter with Kolb finding Larry Fitzgerald on a 37-yard pass and then James Sanders recovering a fumble and returning it 98 yards for a touchdown for leads of 17–0 and then a 24–0 halftime lead.  The Eagles managed to get on the board in the 3rd quarter with Alex Henery's 2 field goals from 36 and 40 yards out to decrease the lead to 24–3 and then 24–6.  In the 4th quarter the Cardinals ended up getting their only points of the 2nd half with Feely's 27-yard field goal to end the game with a final score of 27–6.

With the loss, the Eagles fell to 2–1.

Week 4: vs. New York Giants

After a tough road loss to the Cardinals, the Eagles went back home for division rival game 1 against the Giants.  After a scoreless first quarter the Eagles drew first blood with Michael Vick finding Desean Jackson on a 19-yard touchdown pass for a 7–0 lead before the Giants scored off of a Lawrence Tynes 25-yard field goal to cut the lead to 7–3 at halftime.  After this the Eagles went right back to work in the 3rd quarter with Alex Henery nailing a 20-yard field goal to help his team take a 7-point lead again at 10–3.  However, the Giants managed to tie the game up as Eli Manning found Victor Cruz on a 14-yard touchdown pass to make the score 10–10.  The Eagles moved back into the lead with Henery's 48-yard field goal for a 13–10 lead.  They would score another field goal in the 4th quarter for a 16–10 lead.  However, the Giants were able to take the lead Manning finding Bear Pascoe on a 6-yard touchdown pass for a 17–16 score.  But the Eagles moved down the field and were able to score with Henery's 26-yard field goal for a final score of 19–17.

With the win, the Eagles improved to 3–1.  The team also made it to 1–0 in games where Vick does not turn the ball over.  The Eagles had gone 8–1 in their last 9 games against the Giants by this time. The win against the Giants stood as their last home win until Week 11 of the 2013 season.

Week 5: at Pittsburgh Steelers

The Eagles traveled to western Pennsylvania to take on longtime in-state rival Steelers at Heinz Field.  After a scoreless first quarter, the Steelers were able to get on the board first with Rashard Mendenhall's 13-yard touchdown run for a 7–0 lead followed by Shaun Suisham's 20-yard field goal for a 10–0 lead at halftime.  The Eagles went to work in the 3rd quarter as Michael Vick found LeSean McCoy on a 15-yard touchdown pass to shorten the lead to 10–7.  The Steelers increased their lead with Suisham kicking a 37-yard field goal to make the score 13–7.  The Eaglesl took the lead with Vick hooking up with Brent Celek on a 2-yard touchdown pass for a 14–13 score.  However, the Steelers were able to drive down the field and Suisham wrapped up the game with a game-winning 34-yard field goal for a final score of 16–14.

With the loss, the Eagles dropped to 3–2.

Week 6: vs. Detroit Lions

The Eagles returned home to play against a struggling Lions team.  In the first quarter it was all Lions with Jason Hanson kicking field goals from 46 and 34 yards out for leads of 3–0 and then 6–0.  The Eagles took the lead in the 2nd quarter with Michael Vick's 2-yard touchdown pass to LeSean McCoy for a 7–6 score at halftime.  In the 3rd quarter the Eagles were able to move further ahead with 2 Alex Henery field goals:  26 and 32 yards out for leads of 10–6 and then 13–6.  Henery would kick 49-yard field goal for a 16–6 lead before Matthew Stafford ran for a QB 1-yard touchdown to shorten the Eagles' lead to 3 at 16–13.  But the Eagles again pushed ahead by 10 as Vick found Maclin on a 70-yard touchdown pass for a 23–13 lead.  But then the lead was shortened to 3 again as Stafford found Nate Burleson on a 17-yard touchdown pass for a 23–20 score and then tied the game with Hanson's 19-yard field goal at 23–23 to send the game into overtime.  In overtime, the Eagles won the toss but went 3 and out as the Lions were able to drive down the field and wrap things up with Hanson's game-winning 45-yard field goal to end the game 26–23.

With the loss, the Eagles head into their bye week at 3–3.  The team also dropped to 2–3 in games where Vick turns the ball over.

Week 8: vs. Atlanta Falcons

The Eagles stayed home for a duel with their historic rival undefeated 6–0 Falcons.  Played under cloudy skies, the game was also notable in that the weather conditions heralded the approach of Hurricane Sandy, a storm set to make an unprecedented landfall in nearby New Jersey.  In the first quarter, the Falcons drew first blood as Matt Ryan found Drew Davis for a 15-yard pass to make the score 7–0.  The team increased their lead with Ryan finding Jason Snelling to make it 14–0.  In the 2nd quarter, the Eagles would get on the board with LeSean McCoy's 2-Yard run to make it 14–7.  However, the Falcons responded with Ryan's 63-yard TD pass to Julio Jones to make it 21–7.  The Falcon would increase their lead before halftime with Matt Bryant's 43-yard field goal to make it 24–7.  The Eagles would try to rally in the 3rd quarter with a 33-yard field goal from Alex Henry to shorten the lead to 24–10, but the Falcons pulled away as Bryant would kick a 29-yard field goal to make it 27–10.  In the 4th quarter, Bryant increased the Falcons' lead with a 30-yard field goal to make the score 30–10.  The Eagles tried to rally as Michael Vick found McCoy to make the score 30–17.  However, the Eagles were unable to try to attempt a comeback win as the team dropped to 3–4 on the season.

Week 9: at New Orleans Saints

After a lopsided loss at home to the Falcons, the Eagles traveled down south to New Orleans to take on the Saints in the Mercedes-Benz Superdome.  The Saints scored first with Patrick Robinson returning a Michael Vick interception 99 yards for a touchdown and a 7–0 lead for the only score of the game.  The Eagles got on the board in the 2nd quarter as Alex Henery kicked a 22-yard field goal to cut the lead to 7–3 not long before Chris Ivory ran for a 22-yard touchdown to move the Saints ahead by 11 with a 14–3 lead and then they would score again with Drew Brees finding Marques Coltson on a 1-yard touchdown pass for a 21–3 halftime lead.  The Eagles scored 10 unanswered points in the 3rd quarter with Vick hooking up with DeSean Jackson on a 77-yard touchdown pass for a score of 21–10 and then Henery kicked a 37-yard field goal for a score of 21–13.  But the Saints scored one last time as Brees found Jimmy Graham on a 6-yard touchdown pass for a 28–13 lead which would be the final score of the game as neither team scored in the 4th quarter.

The Eagles lose to the Saints for the first time since the 2009 Season, when the Saints were Super Bowl bound.

With the loss, the Eagles fell to 3–5.

Week 10: vs. Dallas Cowboys

The Eagles returned home for a game against the Cowboys.  They scored first with Michael Vick hooking up with Riley Cooper on a 2-yard touchdown pass for a 7–0 lead, however, the Boys responded with Tony Romo finding Felix Jones on an 11-yard pass for a 7–7 lead.  Then increased their lead in the 2nd quarter as Dan Bailey kicked a 30-yard field goal for a 10–7 halftime lead.  Michael Vick had been knocked out of the game and was possibly out for the season after going 6/9 for 70 yards and a touchdown pass.  Rookie QB Nick Foles would get his first NFL action and threw his first touchdown pass to Jeremy Maclin from 44 yards out as the Eagles retook a 14–10 lead while Henery moved the team ahead 17–10 with a 40-yard field goal.  After this, the Cowboys went back to work as Romo found Dez Bryant on a 30-yard touchdown pass to tie the game at 17–17.  Then the Boys retook the lead with Dwayne Harris returned a punt 78 yards for a touchdown for a 24–17 lead followed up by Brandon Carr returning an interception 47 yards for a touchdown and a 31–17 lead.  The Eagles then got back to work with Stanley Havili 1-yard touchdown run (with a failed PAT) to shorten the lead to 31–23.  But the Boys wrapped the game up with Jason Hatcher's fumble recovery in the end zone for a final score of 38–23.

With the loss, the Eagles dropped to 3–6.

Week 11: at Washington Redskins

The Eagles went to FedExField to face their division rival Redskins in what would be a killer loss for the starting game of Rookie QB Nick Foles.  The young QB was picked off twice as the Skins zoomed passed the Eagles' defense to drop the team to 3–7, snapping their 3-game winning streak to their division rivals, and leaving them in last place in the NFC East.

Week 12: vs. Carolina Panthers

With the loss, the Eagles fell to 3–8.  Foles also went 0–2 as a starter.

Week 13: at Dallas Cowboys

With the loss, the Eagles fell to 3–9 securing them their 3rd losing season since 1999 and their first since 2005.  Thus this season became their 3rd losing season under Andy Reid as the Eagles were swept by the Cowboys for the first time since 2009.  Regardless that the Eagles were now 0–3 with Foles as a starter, Andy named him the team's starting QB for the remainder of the season. Also with the loss, the Eagles were eliminated from playoff contention.

Week 14: at Tampa Bay Buccaneers

Coming into the game, the Philadelphia Phillies baseball team had won more recently than the Eagles, but the Eagles snapped an eight-game losing streak and moved to 4–9 by defeating the Buccaneers in dramatic fashion via a touchdown pass from Nick Foles to Jeremy Maclin as time expired. Rookie Bryce Brown rushed the ball 12 times for only 6 yards, which left Foles as the leading rusher (3 rushes, 27 yards). Foles was prolific through the air as well going 32/51 for 381 yards and 2 TDs.

Although the touchdown which scored as time ran out put the Eagles ahead, the extra point still had to be attempted per NFL rule, because points for and points against are used by some tiebreakers.  That extra point was good, and counted in the final score. This was the last win as head coach of the Eagles for Andy Reid.

Week 15: vs. Cincinnati Bengals

The Philadelphia Eagles made their third appearance in a nationally broadcast game in four weeks against the Cincinnati Bengals on December 13, 2012.

Week 16: vs. Washington Redskins

Week 17: at New York Giants
 With the loss, the Eagles finish the season 4–12, their worst in 14 years. The Eagles fired head coach Andy Reid on Monday, December 31, 2012, ending his 14-year tenure coaching the team.

Standings

References

External links
 

Philadelphia
Philadelphia Eagles seasons
Philadelphia Eagles